Events in the year 2009 in Spain.

Incumbents 
 Monarch – Juan Carlos I
 Prime Minister – José Luis Rodríguez Zapatero

Events 

 March 1 – The Basque Nationalist Party wins a plurality of seats in Spain's Basque Country's parliamentary elections.
 May 18 – Italian Camorra leader Raffaele Amato is arrested in Marbella, Spain.
 June 19 – A bomb explodes near Bilbao in the Basque region of Spain, killing one policeman.
 July 10 – One person is killed by a bull, the first such fatality in 14 years, during the Running of the Bulls in Pamplona, Spain.
 July 21 – Foreign Minister Miguel Ángel Moratinos becomes the first Spanish government official to visit Gibraltar in 300 years.
 July 24 – The Gran Telescopio Canarias, the world's largest reflecting telescope, is inaugurated by King Juan Carlos I of Spain.
 July 29 – 2009 Burgos bombing: A car bomb explodes outside a police barracks in the northern Spanish city of Burgos, injuring dozens of people.
 July 30 – 2009 Palmanova bombing: At least two people are killed in a car bomb explosion at a Guardia Civil barracks in Palma Nova on the Spanish island of Mallorca.
 August 9 – Three bombs explode on the island of Majorca, Spain.
 November 17 – The Spanish ship Alakrana and its crew of 36 are released after a US$3.5 million ransom is paid.

Popular culture

Music

Film
 February 22 – Penélope Cruz wins the Academy Award for Best Supporting Actress for the film Vicky Cristina Barcelona, the first Spanish actress to win an Academy Award.
 September 28 – Spain's Pablo Pineda wins the best actor award at the San Sebastián International Film Festival, the first actor with Down's syndrome to win an international film award.
 2009 – Dance to the Spirits documentary film is released.

Highest-grossing films

Television 
 2009 in Spanish television

Literature

Sport 
 February 1 – Rafael Nadal of Spain defeats Roger Federer of Switzerland to win the 2009 Australian Open men's singles.
 March 15 – Luis León Sánchez wins the Paris–Nice.
 May 13 – FC Barcelona wins the Spanish Cup.
 May 16 – FC Barcelona wins the Liga.
 May 27 – FC Barcelona wins the UEFA Champions League and becomes the first Spanish team to win the treble.
 June 13–14 – Marc Gené, as part of the Peugeot Sport Total team, wins the 24 Hours of Le Mans.
 June 30 – July 3 − The Spanish team wins 83 medals (28 gold, 21 silver, 34 bronze) at the 2009 Mediterranean Games.
 July 26 – Alberto Contador wins the Tour de France.
 August 23 – FC Barcelona wins the Spanish Super Cup.
 August 28 – FC Barcelona wins the UEFA Super Cup.
 September 20 – Spain wins the EuroBasket 2009.
 September 20 – Alejandro Valverde wins the Vuelta a España.
 October 17 – Alberto Contador finishes first in the UCI World Ranking.
 December 13 – Alemayehu Bezabeh wins the European Cross Country Championships.
 December 19 – FC Barcelona wins the FIFA Club World Cup and becomes the first team to win six competitions in one year.

Notable deaths 

 January 6 – Manuela Fernández-Fojaco, 113, Spanish supercentenarian, verified oldest person in Europe.
 February 14 – Luís Andrés Edo, 82, Spanish anarchist.
 March 1 – Pepe Rubianes, 61, Spanish Catalan actor and theatre director, lung cancer.
 April 6 – Mari Trini, 61, Spanish pop singer and actress.
 April 11 – Corín Tellado, 81, Spanish novelist, heart failure.
 April 13 – Ángel Miguel, 79, Spanish professional golfer.
 May 12 – Antonio Vega, 51, Spanish pop singer-songwriter (Nacha Pop), pneumonia.
 May 20 – María Amelia López Soliño, 97, Spanish blogger, world's oldest blogger.
 June 19 – Vicente Ferrer Moncho, 89, Spanish philanthropist.
 June 27 – Victoriano Crémer, 102, Spanish poet and journalist, natural causes.
 July 1 – Baltasar Porcel, 72, Spanish Catalan writer, cancer.
 July 11 – Maria del Carmen Bousada de Lara, 69, Spanish woman believed to be world's oldest mother, cancer.
 August 5 – Jordi Sabater Pi, 87, Spanish ethologist, discovered albino gorilla Snowflake.
 August 8 – Daniel Jarque, 26, Spanish footballer, heart attack.
 August 11 – José Ramón García Antón, 61, Spanish engineer and politician in Valencian Community.
 August 27 – Joaquín Ruiz-Giménez, 96, Spanish politician.
 September 1 – Maria Christina of Bourbon-Parma, 84, Spanish royal (House of Bourbon-Parma), daughter of Elias, Duke of Parma.
 September 19 – Víctor Israel, 80, Spanish actor.
 September 25 – Alicia de Larrocha, pianist (born 1923)
 September 30 – Rafael Arozarena, 86, Spanish writer and poet.
 October 16 – Andrés Montes, 53, Spanish sports commentator.
 October 18 – Ignacio Ponseti, 95, Spanish physician and inventor (Ponseti method).
 October 26 – Sabino Fernández Campo, 91, Spanish Chief of the Royal House, key figure in failed 23-F coup d'état.
 November 2 – José Luis López Vázquez, 87, Spanish actor, after long illness.
 November 3 – Francisco Ayala, novelist (born 1906)
 November 12 – Dámaso Ruiz-Jarabo Colomer, 60, Spanish judge, Advocate-General of the European Court of Justice.
 November 30 – Paul Naschy, 75, Spanish actor, screenwriter and director, pancreatic cancer.
 December 5 – Manuel Prado y Colón de Carvajal, 78, Spanish diplomat.
 December 11 – Francisco Piquer Chanza, 87, Spanish actor.
 December 17 – Albert Ràfols-Casamada, 86, Spanish artist.
 December 30  – Ivan Zulueta, 66, Spanish designer and film director.

See also
 List of Spanish films of 2009

References

External links

 
Spain
Years of the 21st century in Spain
Spain